Alan I. Rothenberg (born April 10, 1939) is an American lawyer and sports executive. He is known for his contributions to and influence on the growth of soccer in the United States. He is the namesake of the Alan I. Rothenberg Trophy, which was awarded annually to the winner of the MLS Cup from 1996 to 2007. Rothenberg was president of U.S. Soccer, the governing body of American soccer, during the 1990s and oversaw the 1994 FIFA World Cup in the United States and the establishment of Major League Soccer in 1996.

Rothenberg earned the FIFA Order of Merit in 2006. Rothenberg was inducted into the U.S. National Soccer Hall of Fame in 2007 in recognition of his contribution as a "Builder" of the sport in the United States. He is a member of the FIFA Ethics Committee.

Early career
Rothenberg was born in 1939 in Detroit, Michigan. He graduated from the University of Michigan Law School in 1963 where he finished top of his class. After law school, he moved to California and began working as a lawyer at the law firm of O'Melveny & Myers. 
He was a fan and follower of traditional American sports.

Soccer

NASL
Rothenberg had no experience with soccer until the age of 28, when he came into contact with the nascent North American Soccer League while serving as a lawyer for Jack Kent Cooke.  Cooke, who owned several sports teams, had also acquired the NASL's Los Angeles Wolves, a short-lived team that lasted only until 1968.

Almost ten years after the folding of the Wolves, Rothenberg headed an investment group that bought the Los Angeles Aztecs, a newer club in the same league, but he sold the team after three seasons in 1980, thus escaping the later collapse of the league.  Rothenberg later stated that his timing in buying the team had simply been wrong — "I mistakenly thought the time was right and three years later I realized that the time was wrong.  I liked soccer, thought it was a great opportunity then, and thought it was now."

U.S. Soccer
In 1984, Rothenberg was asked by Peter Ueberroth, then serving as the organizer of the 1984 Summer Olympics in Los Angeles, to take on the role of commissioner of soccer for the Olympic Games.  The unexpected popularity of soccer that summer — including multiple sell-outs of the 100,000+ seat Rose Bowl — established before the world that an American audience for the game existed. The success of soccer at the 1984 Olympics, under Rothenberg's leadership, was a significant factor in FIFA awarding the United States in 1988 the right to host the 1994 World Cup.

Rothenberg's success in the capacity of commissioner caused FIFA to seek out his services as director of the 1994 World Cup, which FIFA had decided award to the USA. In 1990, with FIFA's backing, Rothenberg defeated the unpopular incumbent Werner Fricker in a landslide in an election for the Presidency of the United States Soccer Federation. Rothenberg was then named Chairman of the World Cup 1994 Organizing Committee. Rothenberg pushed for the 1994 World Cup to be held in large venues.
Under Rothenberg's guidance, the 1994 World Cup was a major success. The tournament set records for attendance, with the 2.5 million attendance breaking the previous record by 1 million, and resulted in U.S. Soccer earning a surplus of more than $50 million.

Fulfilling a promise to FIFA made as part of the World Cup bid, Rothernberg oversaw the establishment of Major League Soccer, the first fully professional U.S. outdoor league since the NASL. Rothenberg was also the major force behind the inception of Project 2010, which was launched in 1998. Rothenberg served as President of the U.S. Soccer Federation for two four-year terms until 1998, when term limits forced him to step down from the post. Rothenberg also played an integral part in organizing the 1999 FIFA Women's World Cup which was hosted by the United States.
Rothenberg remains a member of the USSF executive committee, and is also one of three Vice Presidents of CONCACAF.

In 1998, Rothenberg headed a bid by the Japanese advertising agency Dentsu to buy the San Jose Clash of MLS, but was forced to pull out at a late date due to the Asian stock market crisis.

Basketball
Rothenberg was also an important figure in professional basketball for many years, first as an executive and legal counsel for the Los Angeles Lakers when they were owned by Jack Kent Cooke, and later as president of Donald Sterling's San Diego / Los Angeles Clippers from 1982 to 1989.

Law and business
Rothenberg was a partner in the Los Angeles offices of the law firms Manatt, Phelps, Rothenberg & Phillips and Latham & Watkins, and in 1989–1990 he served as president of the California State Bar.  Before his 2010 resignation, he was president of the Los Angeles World Airports Commission.

In 2004 Rothenberg founded 1st Century Bank, a community bank with offices on the Westside Los Angeles area catering to small businesses and professionals. Rothenberg serves as chairman of the bank, which was acquired by Oklahoma City-based MidFirst Bank in early 2016.  Earlier in his career, Rothenberg was a co-founder (along with his then law partner Chuck Manatt) of First Los Angeles Bank, which was sold to City National Bank in 1995. Rothenberg also serves on several corporate and public boards.

Notes

1939 births
Living people
Lawyers from Detroit
American soccer chairmen and investors
20th-century American Jews
Presidents of the United States Soccer Federation
North American Soccer League (1968–1984) executives
University of Michigan Law School alumni
Lawyers from Los Angeles
Los Angeles Clippers executives
FIFA officials
21st-century American Jews
National Soccer Hall of Fame members